CG-20 may refer to :
 Chase XCG-20, the largest military glider ever built in the United States
 USS Richmond K. Turner (CG-20), a Leahy-class guided missile cruiser of the United States Navy